Levius may refer to:
 The trade name for the drug known as aspirin
Levius, a manga series created by Haruhisa Tanaka that was adapted into a Japanese anime series and released worldwide on Netflix on November 28, 2019